Goudaea is a genus of flowering plants belonging to the family Bromeliaceae.

Its native range is Trinidad, Bolivia, Colombia and Peru.

The genus name of Goudaea is in honour of Eric Gouda (b. 1957), Dutch botanist; specialist in Bromeliaceae. It was first described and published in Phytotaxa Vol.279 on page 51 in 2016.

Known species, according to Kew:
Goudaea chrysostachys 
Goudaea ospinae

References

Tillandsioideae
Bromeliaceae genera
Plants described in 2016
Garden plants
Flora of Trinidad
Flora of Bolivia
Flora of Colombia
Flora of Peru